George Stephenson High School is a coeducational secondary school located in Killingworth, North Tyneside, England.

History

Grammar school
It was called the George Stephenson Grammar School in 1953, at which time it was built on Benton Lane (the Great Lime Road) in West Moor. (George Stephenson lived nearby in a cottage when he worked at Killingworth Colliery.) The current school site in Killingworth is a replacement that opened in 1970, and was originally known as Killingworth High School, a comprehensive, but eventually took the George Stephenson name from the old school. The old school no longer exists as it was demolished in 2004.

The headmaster since the opening of the old school in 1953 was Tom W. King, BA. He became headmaster of the new school and finally retired around the end of the 1981-1982 school year. When he died in 2004 at the age of 94, a plaque reading "Here, from 1956 to 2004, stood a Place of Learning" was placed on the wall of the West Moor Residents Association Community Centre, which now stands on the site of the old grammar school.

Each year group in the grammar school had 3 streams, L, G, and F. The L stream studied 3 years of Latin, 2 of German, and 5 of French. The G stream took German and French.

The popularity of the grammar school was such that it had expanded over the years from about 350 pupils (the capacity of the original main building) to about 600 (by the addition of prefabricated classrooms at the rear of the school).

Until 1970 the school had regular morning assemblies for all pupils. The school hymn was "Guide Me O Thou Great Redeemer". The school motto was Praesis Ut Prosis, "Lead in order to serve."

Comprehensive
It became a comprehensive school in 1970 with the move from the West Moor site to the Killingworth site.

The school was rated Good by Ofsted in November 2019.

Alumni

George Stephenson Grammar School
 Jack Colback, Footballer at Newcastle United
 Scott Davidson (academic)
 John Sadler (historian)

See also
 Stephenson College, Durham

References

External links
 EduBase

News items
 Anne Welsh in 2004

Secondary schools in the Metropolitan Borough of North Tyneside
Educational institutions established in 1953
1953 establishments in England
Foundation schools in the Metropolitan Borough of North Tyneside